Alexander C. Huk is an American neuroscientist at The University of Texas at Austin. He is the Raymond Dickson Centennial Professor #2 of Neuroscience and Psychology, and the Director of the Center for Perceptual Systems. His laboratory studies how the brain integrates information over space and time and how these neural signals guide behavior in the natural world.  He has made contributions towards understanding how the brain represents 3D visual motion and how those representations are used to make perceptual judgments

Education 
Huk received a BA from Swarthmore College in 1996, and earned his PhD from Stanford University under the supervision of David Heeger. He completed his postdoctoral work at the University of Washington with Michael Shadlen.

Career 
In his doctoral work, Huk used fMRI to map the human brain areas associated with visual motion processing. His postdoctoral work investigated the neural mechanisms underlying temporal integration during perceptual decisions. In his own laboratory, Huk and collaborators have used a combination of psychophysics, fMRI, and electrophysiology to establish the neural basis of 3D motion processing. His group has also investigated the neural basis of perceptual decision-making.  In 2011, he won the Young Investigator Award from the Vision Sciences Society.

References

External links 
 Huk lab website
 Google Scholar
 Huk professional "family tree" (Neurotree)
 Center for Perceptual Systems, UT Austin

Living people
American neuroscientists
Stanford University alumni
Swarthmore College alumni
University of Texas at Austin faculty
Year of birth missing (living people)